Sikes Township is a civil township in Mountrail County, North Dakota, United States.

Townships in Mountrail County, North Dakota
Townships in North Dakota